Sin Kyung-hyen (born 12 December 1977) is a South Korean taekwondo practitioner. 

She won a gold medal in heavyweight at the 2001 World Taekwondo Championships, after defeating Wang I-hsien in the final. She won another gold medal at the 2005 World Taekwondo Championships in Madrid. She won a silver medal at the 2000 Asian Taekwondo Championships.

References

External links

1977 births
Living people
South Korean female taekwondo practitioners
World Taekwondo Championships medalists
Asian Taekwondo Championships medalists
21st-century South Korean women